Bardhaman Sadar North subdivision is an administrative subdivision of the Purba Bardhaman district in the state of West Bengal, India.

Overview
The uneven laterite territory found in the western part of Paschim Bardhaman district extends up to Ausgram and then the alluvial floodplains commence. Bardhaman Sadar North subdivision extends from the Kanksa Ketugram plain, which lies along the Ajay on the north to the Bardhaman Plain, the central plain area of the district, with the Damodar on the south and the east.

Subdivisions
Purba Bardhaman district is divided into the following administrative subdivisions:

Note:Before bifurcation of the erstwhile Bardhaman district Galsi I was in Durgapur subdivision, but after bifurcation it is in Bardhman Sadar North subdivision.

Administrative units

Bardhaman Sadar North subdivision has  7 police stations, 7 community development blocks, 7 panchayat samitis, 64 gram panchayats, 603 mouzas, 580 inhabited villages, 2 municipalities and 8 census towns. The two municipalities are at Bardhaman and Guskara. The census towns are: Goda, Bahir Sarbamangala, Mirzapur, Nari, Gangpur, Raipur, Sukdal and Bud Bud. The subdivision has its headquarters at Bardhaman.

Demographics
As per the 2011 Census of India data Bardhaman Sadar North subdivision, after bifurcation of Bardhaman district in 2017, had a total population of 1,586,623. There were 808,443 (51%) males and 778,190 (49%) females. Population below 6 years was 161,621.

As per the 2011 census data the total number of literates in Bardhaman Sadar North subdivision, after bifurcation of Bardhaman district in 2017, was 1,076,352 (75.53% of the population over 6 years) out of which males numbered 592,465 (81.59% of the male population over 6 years) and females numbered 483,837 (69.24% of the female population over 6 years).

See also – List of West Bengal districts ranked by literacy rate

In the 2011 census Hindus numbered 1,224,367 and formed 77.17% of the population in Bardhaman Sadar North subdivision. Muslims numbered 345,264 and formed 21.76% of the population. Christians numbered 4,444 and formed 0.28% of the population. Others numbered 12,548 and formed 0.79% of the population.

Police stations
Police stations in Bardhaman Sadar North subdivision have the following features and jurisdiction:

In the police set up Kanksa PS is under the Subdivisional Police Officer of Bardhaman Sadar North subdivision.

Blocks
Community development blocks in Bardhaman Sadar North subdivision are:

Gram panchayats
The subdivision contains 64 gram panchayats under 7 community development blocks:

 Ausgram–I block consists of seven gram panchayats, viz. Ausgram, Billagram, Dignagar–II, Ukta, Berenda, Dignagar–I and Guskara–II.
 Ausgram–II block consists of seven gram panchayats, viz. Amarpur, Eral, Ramnagar, Vedia, Debshala, Kota and Valki.
 Bhatar block consists of 14 gram panchayats, viz. Amarun–I, Banpash, Eruar, Sahebganj–I, Amarun–II, Barabeloon–I, Mahachanda, Sahebganj–II, Bolgona, Barabeloon–II, Mahata, Bamunara, Bhatar and Nityanandapur.
 Burdwan–I block consists of nine gram panchayats, viz. Baghar–I, Belkash, Rayan–I, Baghar–II, Kshetia, Rayan–II, Bandul–I, Kurmun–I, Saraitikar.
 Burdwan–II block consists of nine gram panchayats, viz. Baikunthapur–I, Barsul–I, Kurmun–II, Baikunthapur–II, Barsul–II, Nabastha–I, Bandul–II, Gobindapur and Nabastha–II.
 Galsi–I block consists of nine gram panchayats, viz. Budbud, Loapur Krishnarampur, Paraj, Uchchagram, Chaktentul, Potna–Pursa, Loa Ramgopalpur, Mankar and Serorai.
 Galsi–II block consists of nine gram panchayats, viz. Adra, Gohogram, Maszidpur, Bhunri, Khano, Sanko, Galsi, Kurkuba and Satinandi.

Economy

Agriculture
In the erstwhile Bardhaman district agriculture was the pre-dominant economic activity and the main source of livelihood for the rural people.  The soil and climate favours the production of food grains. Cash crops are also grown. Irrigation facilities had contributed in a major way towards higher agricultural productivity. Amongst the districts of West Bengal, Bardhaman district had maximum irrigated land under cultivation. Given below is an overview of the agricultural production (all data in tonnes) for Bardhaman Sadar North subdivision, other subdivisions and the Purba Bardhaman district, after bifurcation of the erstwhile Bardhaman district, with data for the year 2013–14.

Education
Given in the table below (data in numbers) is a comprehensive picture of the education scenario in Purba Bardhaman district, after bifurcation of Bardhaman district in 2017, with data for the year 2013-14:

Note: Primary schools include junior basic schools; middle schools, high schools and higher secondary schools include madrasahs; technical schools include junior technical schools, junior government polytechnics, industrial technical institutes, industrial training centres, nursing training institutes etc.; technical and professional colleges include engineering colleges, medical colleges, para-medical institutes, management colleges, teachers training and nursing training colleges, law colleges, art colleges, music colleges etc. Special and non-formal education centres include sishu siksha kendras, madhyamik siksha kendras, centres of Rabindra mukta vidyalaya, recognised Sanskrit tols, institutions for the blind and other handicapped persons, Anganwadi centres, reformatory schools etc.

The following institutions are located in Bardhaman Sadar North subdivision:
University of Burdwan was established at Bardhaman in 1960.
Burdwan Medical College was established at Bardhaman in 1969.
University Institute of Technology, Burdwan University at Bardhaman was established in 1999  
College of Agriculture (Extended Campus of Bidhan Chandra Krishi Viswavidalaya) near Nari.
Kanad Institute of Engineering and Management was established at Mankar in 2008. It is affiliated with Maulana Abul Kalam Azad University of Technology.
Burdwan Institute of Management and Computer Science at Dewandighi, Mirzapur was established in 2001.
Burdwan Raj College was established at Bardhaman in 1881.
St. Xavier's College was established in Bardhaman in 2011.
Vivekananda Mahavidyalaya was established at Bardhaman in 1964.
Maharajadhiraj Uday Chand Women's College was established at Bardhaman in 1955.
Gushkara Mahavidyalaya was established at Guskara in 1955.
Galsi Mahavidyalaya was established at Galsi in 2007.
Mankar College at Mankar was established in 1987, It is affiliated with Kazi Nazrul University.
Dasarathi Hazra Memorial College was established at Bhatar in 2013.
Dr. Bhupendra Nath Dutta Smriti Mahavidyalaya was established at Hatgobindapur in 1996.

Healthcare
The table below (all data in numbers) presents an overview of the medical facilities available and patients treated in the hospitals, health centres and sub-centres in 2014 in Purba Bardhaman district, after bifurcation of the erstwhile Bardhaman district in 2017, with data for the year 2013–14.

Medical facilities available in Bardhaman Sadar North subdivision are as follows:

Hospitals: (Name, location, beds)
Bardhaman Medical College & Hospital, Bardhaman, 1,105 beds
Bardhaman Jail Hospital, Bardhaman, 35 beds
Bardhaman Police Hospital, Bardhaman, 44 beds
Bardhaman Railway Hospital, Bardhaman, 5 beds
Indian Red Cross Society, Bardhaman, 60 beds
Lions Club, Bardhaman, 15 beds
Rural Hospitals: (Name, CD block, location, beds)
Bononabagram Rural Hospital, Ausgram I CD block, Bononabagram, 30 beds
Mankar Rural Hospital, Galsi I CD block, Mankar, 30 beds
Pursha Rural Hospital, Galsi I CD block, Pursha, 30 beds
Bhatar Rural Hospital, Bhatar CD block, Bhatar, 60 beds
Block Primary Health Centres: (Name, block, location, beds)
Kurmun BPHC, Burdwan I CD block, Kurmun, 10 beds
Barshul BPHC, Burdwan II CD block, Barshul, 10 beds
Jamtara BPHC, Ausgram II CD block, Jamtara, PO Amragar, 15 beds
Adrahati BPHC, Galsi II CD block, Adrahati, 15 beds
Primary Health Centres: (CD block-wise)(CD block, PHC location, beds)
Burdwan I CD block: Baghat (4), Jamar, PO Korar (10)
Burdwan II CD block: Bamchandipur, PO Jateram (2), Kashiara PO Hatgobindapur (4)
Bhatar CD block: Balgona (2), Bijipur, PO Basuda (6), Bonpass (10), Erruar, PO Aruarar (10), Nasigram (6), Sahebganj (4)
Ausgram I CD block: Guskara (10 beds), Ukta, PO Pitchkuri Dhal (4), Dignagar (6)
Ausgram II CD block: at Amarpur PO Aduria (6), Bahadurpur, PO Abhirampur (4), Bhatkunda (4), Bhedia (10) and Ramnagar (6)
Galsi I CD block: Bharatpur (6), Lowa, PO Dwarmari (10)
Galsi II CD block: Bhuri (10), Satinadi, PO Khana Junction (10)

Electoral constituencies
Lok Sabha (parliamentary) and Vidhan Sabha (state assembly) constituencies in Bardhaman Sadar North subdivision were as follows:

External links

References

Subdivisions of West Bengal
Subdivisions in Purba Bardhaman district